Q53 may refer to:
 Q53 (New York City bus), a New York City bus route
 An-Najm, the 53rd surah of the Quran
 Franklin Field (California), in Sacramento County, California, United States